Charles Muller Francheville (February 24, 1846 – September 10, 1900) was a merchant, ship owner and political figure in Nova Scotia, Canada. He represented Guysborough County in the Nova Scotia House of Assembly from 1874 to 1878 as a Liberal member.

He was born in Guysborough, Nova Scotia, the son of Edward H. Francheville and Sarah Peart. He was a ship's master for several years before becoming a merchant and shipper of goods. Francheville was also a justice of the peace, a major in the militia and an agent for several insurance companies. In 1868, he married Harriet Amelia Jost. He was first elected to the provincial assembly in an 1874 by-election held after John Angus Kirk was elected to the House of Commons of Canada; Francheville was reelected in the general election held later that year. In 1878, he was named to the province's Legislative Council.

References 

The Canadian biographical dictionary and portrait gallery of eminent and self-made men: ... (1881)
The Canadian parliamentary companion and annual register, 1881, CH Mackintosh

1856 births
Nova Scotia Liberal Party MLAs
Nova Scotia Liberal Party MLCs
1900 deaths
People from Guysborough County, Nova Scotia